Ransäter is a smaller locality in Munkfors Municipality, Sweden. In 2010, it had a population of 114.

Ransäter is the birthplace of Erik Gustaf Geijer, Sten Bergman, and Tage Erlander.

References

External links

Populated places in Munkfors Municipality